Un paso al abismo, was one of the first Mexican soap operas in 1958 being directed and produced by Rafael Banquells. This telenovela occupy the hours of 6:30 pm on Canal 4, Telesistema Mexicano.

Cast
Silvia Derbez
Luis Beristain
Enrique Del Castillo
Lorenzo de Rodas
María Gentil Arcos
Bárbara Gil
Queta Lavat
Mario Requena

External links 
Un paso al abismo in Alma-latina.net

Mexican telenovelas
Televisa telenovelas
Television shows set in Mexico
1958 telenovelas
1958 Mexican television series debuts
1959 Mexican television series endings
Spanish-language telenovelas